Two Hearts in May is a 1958 West German musical comedy film directed by Géza von Bolváry and starring Dieter Borsche, Kristina Söderbaum, and Walter Giller.

The film's sets were designed by the art directors Hans Kuhnert and Wilhelm Vorwerg. It was shot at the Tempelhof Studios in Berlin.

Cast

References

Bibliography

External links 
 

1958 films
1958 musical comedy films
German musical comedy films
West German films
1950s German-language films
Films directed by Géza von Bolváry
UFA GmbH films
Films set in the 1930s
Films about composers
Films shot at Tempelhof Studios
1950s German films